Mungkid is the capital of Magelang Regency, Central Java, Indonesia. The town center is located in the village of Sawitan. All government offices or agencies of Magelang regency are located here, including the offices owned by private parties. Mungkid town was founded on March 22, 1984 to replace the city of Magelang as the capital town of Magelang regency.  Each March 22 is celebrated by the citizens of Magelang regency as Mungkid's anniversary. Many people consider this town as an administrative town and alternative city. The major Buddhist temple of Borobudur is about 4 km from the center of Mungkid.

History 
After Independence in Indonesia in 1945, the city of Magelang was declared as the capital of the Magelang regency.  However in 1950, Magelang city was declared a separate municipality and was given the right to manage its own affairs. It was therefore decided to relocate the capital of Magelang regency. Besides providing independence to Magelang city to manage its own affairs, other considerations also pointed to the advantages of locating the capital of the regency.  It was felt that the establishment of a separate administrative capital might help to stimulate the growth and development of the region. Four alternatives were considered as the site of the new district capital:  Mungkid, Muntilan, Secang and Mertoyudan.

Mertoyudan District and Mungkid District in the town center of Sawitan were selected as the capital of the Magelang regency with the name of Mungkid. The inauguration of Mungkid as the capital took place on March 22, 1984 attended by Central Java Governor HM Ismail.

Villages 
 Ambartawang
 Blondho
 Bojong
 Bumireja
 Gondhang
 Mendut
 Mungkid
 Ngrajek
 Pabèlan
 Pagersari
 Paremana
 Pragawati
 Rambeanak
 Sawitan
 Senden
 Treka

Climate
Mungkid has a tropical monsoon climate (Am) with moderate to little rainfall from June to September and heavy to very heavy rainfall from October to May.

References 

Magelang Regency
Districts of Central Java
Regency seats of Central Java